Gregory Horror Show, known in Japan as  is a mystery, survival horror game based on the computer-generated imagery (CGI) anime series of the same name. The game was published by Capcom in Japan and Europe, but was not released in North America.

Gameplay
Players must navigate the hotel, retrieving the bottled souls which the hotel guests have been carrying. Neko Zombie, a heavily stitched cat who has become imprisoned in his room, introduces players to the control scheme and methods of spying on guests and stealing the souls back. Spying through keyholes allows players to eavesdrop useful information from guests, as well as scout ahead before plunging into a room and coming face-to-face with guests.

Guests will usually flee if they see the player character, while they still possess a bottled soul. Once the player has recovered the soul from that particular guest, instead of fleeing they will chase and attack the player, reclaiming the soul should the player still be holding it. The guests can all run faster than the player's character, making stealth an important aspect of play. It is possible to hide in wardrobes, but this must be achieved while any pursuing guests are out of sight.

As play progresses and souls are collected, more guests check-in the hotel and more hotel rooms and areas become available for exploration. This is in addition to the guests who have already been relieved of their soul bottles - these prowl the corridors of the hotel, looking for the player, making it increasingly difficult to travel from one location to another without being seen.

Plot

The game begins with the protagonist walking through a forest in a deep fog. They have no memory of how they ended up in the forest. They eventually see a bright light coming from a hotel, Gregory House, which is the game's main setting. They enter the hotel and are greeted by Gregory, the mouse that runs the hotel. He asks the player what their name and gender is, allowing them to proceed. From there, he gives them a room in the hotel.

That night, after the player has fallen asleep, they meet Death in a dream. He tells the player that they have been trapped at Gregory House, but that he will help them to escape. In return, he wants the player to find 12 lost souls which are kept by residents of Gregory House. Death makes the promise that, once he has received the 12 souls, he will help them to escape.

The player, upon waking, hears screaming from the neighbouring room, which is locked. The room's inhabitant, Neko Zombie, asks the player to get the key for the room by stealing it from Gregory. Once the player has done so, they encounter Neko Zombie. Neko Zombie gives the player explanations on various aspects of the game and, once the tutorial is finished, he gives them the game's first lost soul.

After this, the player needs to retrieve the souls from each guest as they come into the hotel. As the story progresses, the story introduces Gregory's mother, who feeds on lost souls to retain her youth.

Once the player has retrieved every soul, Death tells the player that he will help them to escape, but the player declines; before they leave, they want to bring Neko Zombie with them. They then go to Neko Zombie's room, asking him to accompany them. Neko Zombie declines, urging the player to hurry and leave. The player, before leaving, gives Neko Zombie a red handkerchief to tie over his foot, which has been injured by a ball-and-chain.

The player then goes to the lobby, where the door is locked. There is a boss battle with Gregory's mother, in which the player has to get her to break the door down. Once this is done, the player flees Gregory House. Gregory takes on a ghostly form and gives chase, but the player manages to escape to reality.

Back at Gregory House, Neko Zombie burns down the hotel, destroying it and killing everyone inside, including himself, Gregory, Gregory's mother and all of the guests.

The game's ending shows that the hotel was a creation of the player, and served as an escape for the struggles of reality. The player then states that should they ever grow bored with life in reality, they will find their way back to the hotel once again. Gregory house is then shown being reconstructed, and Gregory has a room prepared for the player when they return.

Reception

The game received "generally favourable reviews" according to the review aggregation website Metacritic. In Japan, Famitsu gave it a score of one nine, one eight, one seven, and one eight for a total of 32 out of 40.

PlayStation 2 Official Magazine – Spain gave it a score of 7.2 out of 10, saying that "The concept of the game is good in principle, although in the end it becomes repetitive." Eurogamer gave it a score of 7 out of 10, rewarding it's curiosity and experimentation compared to other Capcom titles but still acknowledging the small issues present in the game. A good portion of game reviewers admired the game's uniqueness but found the gameplay mechanics became stale after some time. It was also common that reviewers were unsure of what demographic the game was aimed at because of the blocky more cartoonish style and simplistic gameplay.

Notes

References

External links
 

2003 video games
Capcom games
2000s horror video games
PlayStation 2 games
PlayStation 2-only games
Video games based on anime and manga
Video games developed in Japan
Video games featuring protagonists of selectable gender
Video games about time loops
Video games about the paranormal
Survival video games
Video games about mice and rats
Video games about skeletons
Video games set in hotels
Video games about personifications of death
Zombie and revenant characters in video games
Fiction about purgatory